Zealand is an island in Denmark.

Zealand may also refer to:
 Zealand, known in Dutch as Zeeland, a province in the Netherlands
 Zealand, New Brunswick, Canada
 Mount Zealand, in the White Mountains of New Hampshire, United States
Zealand Notch, an adjacent mountain pass
 Zealand River, which flows North out of the notch
 Zealand, a 19th century logging community in Zealand
Region Zealand, a Danish administrative region

See also
 
 New Zealand (disambiguation)
 Sealand (disambiguation)
 Seeland (disambiguation)
 Zealandia (disambiguation)
 Zeeland (disambiguation)